Paola Ghidoni (born 8 July 1963) is an Italian politician who has been serving as a Member of the European Parliament for Lega Nord since 2022.

See also 
 List of members of the European Parliament for Italy, 2019–2024

References 

Living people
1963 births
21st-century Italian politicians
21st-century Italian women politicians
MEPs for Italy 2019–2024
Lega Nord MEPs
21st-century women MEPs for Italy